Sir Patrick Neville Garland (born 22 July 1929) is a retired British barrister and judge. He was a judge of the High Court (Queen’s Bench Division) from 1985 to 2002.

Educated at Uppingham School and Sidney Sussex College, Cambridge, Garland was called to the Bar by the Middle Temple in 1953. In 1972, he was appointed a recorder and a Queen's Counsel. He  was appointed a Justice of the High Court on 14 October 1985 and received the customary knighthood on 19 February 1986. He was appointed a Presiding Judge of the North Eastern Circuit in 1990. He retired on 14 October 2002.

He is an honorary fellow of Sidney Sussex College, Cambridge and a member of the Free Speech Union's legal advisory council.

References 

Knights Bachelor
Queen's Bench Division judges
People educated at Uppingham School
Alumni of Sidney Sussex College, Cambridge
Members of the Middle Temple
1929 births
Living people